Arthur Francis Lane (11 June 1910- Apr 1987) was a British actor.

Filmography

References

External links

1910 births
1987 deaths
Male actors from Birmingham, West Midlands
English male film actors
20th-century English male actors